The Cedar Rapids Kernels are Minor League Baseball team of the Midwest League and the High-A affiliate of the Minnesota Twins. They are located in Cedar Rapids, Iowa, and play their home games at Veterans Memorial Stadium. The Kernels are owned by Cedar Rapids Ball Club, Inc. (also known as Cedar Rapids Baseball Club, Inc.).

Cedar Rapids baseball history
Cedar Rapids first began play in 1890 and have played 110 seasons through 2015. The franchise has been a member of various leagues preceding the Midwest League. They have been a member of the Central Association (1949), Western League (1934–1937), Mississippi Valley League (1922–1932), Central Association (1913–1917), Illinois–Indiana–Iowa League (1901–1909, 1920–1921, 1938–1942, 1950–1961), Western Association (1896–1899), Eastern Iowa League (1895) and the Illinois–Iowa League (1890–1891). The team also had numerous nicknames prior to joining the Midwest League:  Cedar Rapids Braves (1958–1962), Cedar Rapids Raiders (1953–1957), Cedar Rapids Indians (1950–1952), Cedar Rapids Rockets (1949), Cedar Rapids Raiders (1934–1942), Cedar Rapids Red Raiders (1963–1964), Cedar Rapids Bunnies (1904–1932), Cedar Rapids Rabbits (1896–1903) and Cedar Rapids Canaries (1890–1891).

When Cedar Rapids was awarded a Midwest League franchise in 1962,  the franchise switched back to the Red Raiders (1962–1964) nickname. Subsequently, the team used the name of the major league franchise it affiliated with: the Cardinals (1965–1972), the Astros (1973–1974), the Giants (1975–1979), and the Reds (1980–1992).  The team adopted the current  "Kernels" nickname before the 1993 season. On the field, the franchise won Midwest League championships in 1988, 1992, and 1994.

In conjunction with Major League Baseball's restructuring of Minor League Baseball in 2021, the Kernels were organized into the High-A Central. In 2022, the High-A Central became known as the Midwest League, the name historically used by the regional circuit prior to the 2021 reorganization.

Ballpark

The team's first home ballpark was Belden Hill Park, followed by the original Veterans Memorial Stadium, which opened in 1949.  In August 2000 voters approved a referendum to build a new ballpark adjacent to the old one, which was demolished after the 2001 season.  The new Veterans Memorial Stadium was completed in time for the opening of the 2002 season, and the Kernels set a franchise attendance record of 196,066 in the new park's inaugural year.

Roster

Notable alumni
Baseball Hall of Fame alumni 
 Lou Boudreau (1938) Inducted, (1970)
 Trevor Hoffman (1991) Inducted, (2018)
 John McGraw (1891) Inducted, (1937)
 Ted Simmons (1967) Inducted, (2020)
Notable alumni

Barney Pelty (1903)
 Bill Wambsganss (1913)
 Bill Zuber (1932)
 Allie Reynolds (1940–41) 5 x MLB All-Star; 1952 AL ERA Leader
 Rocky Colavito (1952) 6 x MLB All-Star; 1959 AL Home Run Leader;  1965 AL RBI Leader
 John Roseboro (1955) 4 x MLB All-Star
 Denis Menke (1958–59) 2 x MLB All-Star
 Tony Cloninger (1959) 
 Tommie Aaron (1960)
 Ron Hunt (1960–61) 2 x MLB All-Star
 Nate Colbert (1965) 3 x MLB All-Star
 Pedro Borbon (1966)
 Jerry Reuss (1967) 2 x MLB All-Star
 Ken Reitz (1969) GG; MLB All-Star
 Bob Forsch (1970) 
 Jerry Mumphrey (1972) MLB All-Star
 Larry Herndon (1972)
 Joe Sambito (1974) MLB All-Star
 Bob Brenly (1977) MLB All-Star; MGR: 2001 World Series Champions – Arizona Diamondbacks
 Chili Davis (1978) 3 x MLB All-Star
 Rob Deer (1979)
 Eric Davis (1982) 2 x MLB All-Star
 Paul O'Neill (1982) 5 x MLB All-Star
 Chris Sabo (1983) 3 x MLB AS; 1988 NL Rookie of the Year
 Kal Daniels (1983)
 Kurt Stillwell (1984) MLB All-Star
 Rob Dibble (1985) 2 x MLB All-Star
 Reggie Sanders (1990) MLB All-Star
 Bengie Molina (1994–95) 
 Jason Dickson (1995) MLB All-Star
 Jarrod Washburn (1995) 
 Ramón Ortiz (1997)
 Ken Hill (1998) MLB All-Star
 John Lackey (2000) MLB All-Star; 2007 AL ERA Leader
 Bobby Jenks (2001) 2 x MLB All-Star
 Mike Napoli (2001–02) MLB All-Star
 Ervin Santana (2002) 2 x MLB All-Star
 Casey Kotchman (2002)
 Jeff Mathis (2002) 
 Joel Peralta (2002) 
 Joe Saunders (2002) MLB All-Star
 Alberto Callaspo (2003) 
 Erick Aybar (2003)  MLB All-Star
 Howie Kendrick (2004) MLB All-Star; 2019 World Series Champion – Washington Nationals
 Sean Rodriguez (2004) 
 Alexi Casilla (2004–05)
 Miguel González (2005) 
 Nick Adenhart (2006) Died Age 22
 Darren O'Day (2006) MLB All-Star
 Mark Trumbo (2006–07) MLB All-Star
 Jordan Walden (2008) MLB All-Star
 Mike Trout (2009–10) 8 x MLB All-Star; 2012 AL Rookie of the Year; 3 x  AL Most Valuable Player (2014, 2016, 2019)
 Garrett Richards (2010) 
 Jean Segura (2010) MLB All-Star
 Patrick Corbin (2010)  2 x MLB All-Star; 2019 World Series Champion – Washington Nationals
 Mike Clevinger (2012)
 Byron Buxton (2013)
 Joe Mauer (2014)  6 x MLB All-Star; 3 x AL Batting Title (2006, 2008, 2009); 2009 AL Most Valuable Player 
 Ricky Nolasco (2015)

References

Sources

 Dinda, Joel (2003), "Cedar Rapids, Iowa, in the Midwest League"
 Koolbeck, Mike, "History of Cedar Rapids Professional Baseball", published in the Cedar Rapids Kernels Souvenir Program, 2001

External links
 
 

Baseball teams established in 1890
Sports in Cedar Rapids, Iowa
Midwest League teams
Minnesota Twins minor league affiliates
Los Angeles Angels of Anaheim minor league affiliates
Anaheim Angels minor league affiliates
California Angels minor league affiliates
Cincinnati Reds minor league affiliates
San Francisco Giants minor league affiliates
Houston Astros minor league affiliates
St. Louis Cardinals minor league affiliates
Milwaukee Braves minor league affiliates
Brooklyn Dodgers minor league affiliates
Chicago Cubs minor league affiliates
Cleveland Guardians minor league affiliates
Professional baseball teams in Iowa
Central Association
Illinois-Indiana-Iowa League teams
1890 establishments in Iowa
Central Association teams
High-A Central teams